The 1890–91 Scottish Football League was the first season of the Scottish Football League. It began on 16 August 1890 and concluded on 21 May 1891. The league was won jointly by Dumbarton and Rangers who ended the season with an equal number of points.

Season overview
Dumbarton and Rangers ended the league season with an equal number of points so a play-off match was organised at Cathkin Park in Glasgow on 21 May 1891 to determine the winner. The game ended in a 2–2 draw so both clubs were declared champions.

On 30 September 1890 after playing four games in the league, Renton was suspended by the Scottish Football Association for professionalism, and the club was subsequently expelled from the league with their record expunged. Celtic, 3rd LRV and Cowlairs were docked four points each for fielding ineligible players. At the end of the season, the bottom three teams had to submit applications to rejoin the league for the next season along with other non-league clubs. St Mirren, Vale of Leven and Cowlairs submitted applications along with non-league club Leith Athletic. In the election, Cowlairs lost their league position to Leith Athletic, with St Mirren and Vale of Leven being re-elected.

Clubs
The inaugural season of the Scottish Football League was contested by 11 clubs. This was reduced to 10 clubs after four games when Renton was expelled from the league for professionalism.

Table

Results

Championship play-off
Rangers defeated 3rd Lanark RV 4–1 in their final league match on 9 May 1891 to move level with Dumbarton on 29 points, and a play-off was organised to determine which team would be crowned champions. However, the match finished as a draw and, with no more dates available for a further replay before the end of the season, it was decided that Dumbarton and Rangers would be declared joint champions.

See also
1890–91 in Scottish football
1904–05 Scottish Division One#Championship play-off

References

 

 
1890-91
1890–91 domestic association football leagues
1